Vintage is an unincorporated community located in Paradise Township, Lancaster County, Pennsylvania.  It is located approximately 2 miles to the east of the town of Paradise, on U.S. Route 30.

The Paradise Quarry, currently owned and operated by Allan Myers, Inc., is just south of Vintage on McIlvaine Road.

The Vintage Dolomite is named after exposures along the Pennsylvania Railroad near Vintage.

It was the birthplace of actor Curtis Cregan.

References

Unincorporated communities in Lancaster County, Pennsylvania
Unincorporated communities in Pennsylvania